Richard "Ricky" Browne (born 26 August 1950) is a former Australian rules footballer who played with Geelong in the Victorian Football League (VFL).

Career
Browne was an accomplished player for Geelong West in the Victorian Football Association (VFA) before being recruited to the VFL. A centreman in Geelong West's 1972 premiership team, Browne also won his second successive club best and fairest that year. He was one vote off winning the J. J. Liston Trophy in 1973, which went to Ray Shaw from Preston.

Both Ricky and younger brother Mark Browne debuted for Geelong in the opening round of the 1974 VFL season, against Footscray at Western Oval. He put together 18 league games that season and made a further seven appearances the following year. In 1976 was cleared to East Fremantle, which helped Geelong secure Brian Peake.

He was non playing coach of Geelong West in the 1981 VFA season.

References

External links

1950 births
Australian rules footballers from Victoria (Australia)
Geelong Football Club players
East Fremantle Football Club players
Geelong West Football Club players
Geelong West Football Club coaches
Living people